Street Action is the seventh studio album by Canadian rock band Bachman–Turner Overdrive (BTO), released in 1978. It was the first BTO album released after the 1977 departure of co-founder Randy Bachman. As part of an agreement upon leaving, Randy requested the rights to the full Bachman surname to use for his pending solo album, then sold the rights to "BTO" and its trademarks to the remaining three band members. Thus, the band was required to release its next two albums (the remaining two under their contract with Mercury Records) using only BTO as the band name, and not Bachman-Turner Overdrive.

BTO replaced Randy Bachman with bassist/vocalist Jim Clench, who had most recently been in April Wine. Fred Turner, who played bass on all previous BTO releases, moved to rhythm guitar, and he shared lead vocal duties with Clench. Street Action had a distinctively heavier sound than the previous two BTO studio albums (Head On and Freeways). Said music blogger Dave Mosier, "[From] the first track, I knew that they were getting back to the sound I liked. The sound that they had abandoned on their Freeways album."

The album was reissued in 2016 as part of the Bachman-Turner Overdrive Classic Albums Box Set.

Production
The album was recorded at Mushroom Studios in Vancouver, British Columbia.

Critical reception
Rolling Stone wrote that "C.F. Turner suffers from Bachman’s ailment of being unable to sing a cliché with enough conviction to make you forget it’s a cliché."

Track listing
(All songs by Clench, Thornton, Turner and Robbie Bachman)

"I'm in Love" – 3:52 (lead vocal: C.F. Turner)
"Down the Road" – 4:03 (lead vocal: Jim Clench)
"Takes a Lot of People" – 4:06 (lead vocal: Turner)
"A Long Time for a Little While" – 3:52 (lead vocal: Clench)
"Street Action" – 4:16 (lead vocal: Turner)
"For Love" – 4:39 (lead vocal: Turner)
"Madison Avenue" – 6:01 (lead vocal: Turner)
"You're Gonna Miss Me" – 4:07 (lead vocal: Clench)
"The World Is Waiting for a Love Song" – 5:04 (lead vocal: Turner)

Personnel
Robbie Bachman - drums, percussion
Jim Clench - bass, vocals
Blair Thornton - lead guitar
C.F. Turner - guitar, vocals
with:
John Hall - piano on "I'm In Love"
Tom Keenlyside - saxophone on "Madison Avenue"

Production
Engineer: Rolf Henneman
Assistant engineer: Jeff Tolman
Art direction: James OMara
Photography: James OMara

Charts

References

Bachman–Turner Overdrive albums
1978 albums
Mercury Records albums